Anagliptin (INN; trade name Suiny) is a pharmaceutical drug for the treatment of type 2 diabetes mellitus.  It is approved for use in Japan.  It belongs to the class of anti-diabetic drugs known as dipeptidyl peptidase-4 inhibitors or "gliptins".

References 

Dipeptidyl peptidase-4 inhibitors
Nitriles
Pyrazolopyrimidines